West Midlands Railway may refer to:

 West Midland Railway, a defunct railway company which operated in England 1860–1863
 West Midlands Rail Executive, partnership of transport authorities in England involved in the operation of rail transport
 West Midlands Trains, a train operating company established in England in 2017, operating as West Midlands Railway and London Northwestern Railway

See also
 List of railway stations in the West Midlands